The New Government Reserved Area (New GRA) is an upper middle class mixed-use neighborhood of Port Harcourt, the capital and largest city in Rivers State.

Geography
New GRA is bordered by D-line and Diobu to the south, Rumueme to the west, Rumuola to the north, and Elekahia to the east. It is located about 5.6 km (3.5 miles) southwest of Port Harcourt's Shell RA. The geographical coordinates of the neighborhood are: 4°49'16"N, 7°0'4"E (Latitude:4.821332; Longitude:7.003355).

Nearby places

Overview
New GRA is known to be a nightlife friendly neighborhood and hosts the largest concentration of bars and nightclubs in Port  Harcourt. It is a favorite hangout for most visitors and tends to be frequented by high-end prostitutes at night. New GRA is split up into phases 1, 2, 3, 4 and 5. The neighborhood, along with its numerous nightspots possesses many assets including a large range of restaurants, fast food establishments and popular hotels.

Education

Private schools
Greenoak International School
Norwegian International School

See also

Old GRA, Port Harcourt

References

External links

D-line
Neighbourhoods in Port Harcourt
Geography of Port Harcourt (local government area)